Senhouse is a surname, and may refer to:

 Humphrey Senhouse (politician) (1731–1814), British Tory politician
 Humphrey Fleming Senhouse (1781–1841), British Royal Navy officer
 Richard Senhouse (died 1626), English Bishop of Carlisle
 Roger Senhouse (1899–1970), English publisher and translator
 William Senhouse (died 1505), English Bishop of Durham

See also
John L. Senn House